Big Echo is the second studio album released by The Morning Benders, currently known as POP ETC, in 2010.  It was co-produced by Grizzly Bear bassist Chris Taylor.

Track listing
 "Excuses" – 5:17
 "Promises" – 3:03
 "Wet Cement" – 3:55
 "Cold War (Nice Clean Fight)" – 1:44
 "Pleasure Sighs" – 4:28
 "Hand Me Downs" – 3:45
 "Mason Jar" – 4:45
 "All Day Day Light" – 3:38
 "Stitches" – 5:04
 "Sleeping In" – 3:14

References 

2010 albums
The Morning Benders albums
Rough Trade Records albums
Albums produced by Chris Taylor (Grizzly Bear musician)